Leyfield is a surname. Notable people with the surname include:

Charlie Leyfield (1911–1982), English footballer
Jack Leyfield (1923–2014), English footballer

See also
Layfield, a surname
Leafield
Leyfields, a housing estate in Tamworth, Staffordshire, England